The Journal of Cerebral Blood Flow & Metabolism is a monthly peer-reviewed medical journal the official journal of the International Society for Cerebral Blood Flow & Metabolism and publishes peer-reviewed research and review papers. covering research on experimental, theoretical, and clinical aspects of brain circulation, metabolism and imaging. The editor-in-chief is Jun Chen (University of Pittsburgh). According to the Journal Citation Reports, the journal has a 2020 impact factor of 6.200.

References

External links
 
 International Society for Cerebral Blood Flow & Metabolism

Neuroscience journals
Publications established in 1981
Nature Research academic journals
English-language journals
Monthly journals
Delayed open access journals
Academic journals associated with learned and professional societies